The yellow-throated apalis (Apalis flavigularis) is a passerine bird in the family Cisticolidae. It is endemic to Malawi.  It was sometimes considered it to be a subspecies of the bar-throated apalis.

Its natural habitats are subtropical or tropical moist lowland forest and subtropical or tropical moist montane forest. It is threatened by habitat loss.

References

yellow-throated apalis
Birds of East Africa
Endemic fauna of Malawi
yellow-throated apalis
Taxonomy articles created by Polbot